The Warp Factor is a 1980 video game published by Strategic Simulations.

Contents
The Warp Factor is a game in which up to 10 ships can participate in a space battle, and combatants can include the Alliance, Klargons, and Remans, and the player can command an outpost, starbase, or starship.

Reception
Forrest Johnson reviewed The Warp Factor in The Space Gamer No. 39. Johnson commented that "The Warp Factor is a challenging game. Our machine was kept pretty busy by staffers who wanted to know, for example, how Captain Kirk would do against a swarm of Tie-fighters. It is slow, but it can keep your attention. And it is a good buy for the Star Fleet Battles addict who can't find an opponent."

Reviews
Moves #57, p14

See also
Star Fleet Battles
List of Star Trek games

References

External links
Softalk
1984 Software Encyclopedia from Electronic Games
Review in Creative Computing

1980 video games
Apple II games
DOS games
Space combat simulators
Strategic Simulations games
Strategy video games
Video games developed in the United States